The 1934 Washington University Bears football team was an American football team that represented Washington University in St. Louis as a member of the Missouri Valley Conference (MVC) during the 1934 college football season. In its third season under head coach Jimmy Conzelman, the team compiled a 7–3 record, won the MVC championship, and outscored opponents by a total of 212 to 59. The team played its home games at Francis Field in St. Louis.

Schedule

References

Washington University
Washington University Bears football seasons
Missouri Valley Conference football champion seasons
Washington University Bears football